Miles Ross (April 30, 1827 – February 22, 1903)  was an American Democratic Party politician and businessman who represented New Jersey's 3rd congressional district in the United States House of Representatives for four terms from 1875 to 1883.

Early life and education
Born in Raritan Township, New Jersey, Ross received a practical English education and engaged in the transportation of freight by water and in the coal business with his father.

Career
He served on the Board of Chosen Freeholders from New Brunswick, New Jersey, from 1859 to 1864, was a member of the New Jersey General Assembly in 1863 and 1864 and was a director of several banks. Ross was a member of the board of street commissioners in 1865 and 1866, was Mayor of New Brunswick, New Jersey, from 1867 to 1869.

Congress
Ross was elected as a Democrat to Congress in 1874, serving from 1875 to 1883, being unsuccessful for reelection in 1882. There, he served as chairman of the Committee on Militia from 1877 to 1881.

Later career and death
After leaving Congress, Ross was a delegate to the Democratic National Conventions in 1884, 1888 and 1892 and engaged in the wholesale and retail coal business.

He died in New Brunswick on February 22, 1903, and was interred in Elmwood Cemetery in North Brunswick, New Jersey.

References

External links

1827 births
1903 deaths
American energy industry executives
Democratic Party members of the New Jersey General Assembly
Mayors of New Brunswick, New Jersey
County commissioners in New Jersey
People from Raritan Township, New Jersey
Democratic Party members of the United States House of Representatives from New Jersey
Burials at Elmwood Cemetery (North Brunswick, New Jersey)
19th-century American politicians
19th-century American businesspeople